Awkward Thought is a New York hardcore punk band that was formed in the 1990s.

After numerous compilation appearances and two demo tapes, Awkward Thought released their first full-length album Mayday, consisting of seventeen songs, on an American label Blackout Records in 2000; the album was released by I Scream Records in Europe. Exclaim! called the album  "particularly outstanding" solid and "appeal[ing]" to hardcore fans of 1980s music. Awkward Thought did a full coast-to-coast United States tour in summer 2000.

In 2001, Awkward Thought released a CD/EP titled Fear Not on Grapes of Wrath Records. Grapes of Wrath is a division of Coretex Records, which is based in Berlin, Germany. Awkward Thought toured Europe in summer 2001.

In summer 2002, Awkward Thought did a full UK tour.

Also in 2002, Awkward Thought released their second full-length CD, Ruin a Good Time, on I Scream Records in Europe, and then toured Europe in fall 2002. The Ruin A Good Time CD was released in the US in 2003 by Thorp Records. The European CD and the American CD had different artwork and layouts.

References

Hardcore punk groups from New York (state)